The 1877 Amherst football team represented Amherst College during the 1877 college football season.

Schedule

References

Amherst
Amherst Mammoths football seasons
College football undefeated seasons
Amherst football